There Are No Villains is a lost 1921 American silent crime melodrama film starring Viola Dana and produced and directed by Bayard Veiller.

Cast
Viola Dana - Rosa Moreland
Gaston Glass - John King
Edward Cecil - George Sala
DeWitt Jennings - Detective Flint
Fred Kelsey - Dugall
Jack Cosgrave - Reverend Stiles

References

External links

1921 films
American silent feature films
Lost American films
American crime drama films
American black-and-white films
1921 crime drama films
Melodrama films
Metro Pictures films
1921 drama films
1921 lost films
1920s American films
Silent American drama films